Ministry of Family, Labour and Social Policy of the Republic of Poland was formed in 2005 to administer issues related to labour and social policy of Poland. It was named Ministry of Labour and Social Policy until late 2015 when it was renamed to Ministry of Family, Labour and Social Policy.

The ministry was formed from the former and short-lived Ministry of Social Affairs (created from 2004) and still existing, but reduced Ministry of Economy. From the Ministry of Economy, the new ministry acquired the competences in the fields of employment and combating unemployment, relations and conditions of labor, labor-related benefits, and trade union relations. The social policy part of the ministry gives it competences over the issues of family issues, and social benefits and welfare.

The ministry supervises the Zakład Ubezpieczeń Społecznych.

Since 2019 the current Minister of Labour and Social Policy is Marlena Maląg

List of ministers

External links
 Ministry of Labour and Social Policy of the Republic of Poland

Labour and Social Policy
Poland
Poland
Poland
Poland, Labour and Social Policy
2005 establishments in Poland
Welfare in Poland